Lydia A. Emerencia (born 1954 in Aruba) was Island Governor of Bonaire from 1 March 2012 to 1 March 2014.

Emerencia received a PhD at the University of Utrecht and a PhD from the Katholieke Universiteit Nijmegen. Prior to becoming Island Governor of Bonaire, she was a faculty member of the University of Aruba.

References

1954 births
Living people
Lieutenant Governors of Bonaire
Bonaire politicians
Bonaire women in politics
Academic staff of the University of Aruba
Utrecht University alumni
Radboud University Nijmegen alumni
Aruban politicians